Charles Pelham ( – 6 February 1763) of Brocklesby, Lincolnshire, was a British landowner and Tory politician who sat in the House of Commons for 28 years between 1722 and 1754.

Early life
Pelham was born in  into a junior branch of the Pelhams of Sussex. He was the eldest son of Charles Pelham of Brocklesby and his wife Elizabeth Warton, daughter of Michael Warton, MP of Beverley, Yorkshire. His father died in 1692, and he succeeded to his estates. In 1725, as co-heir to Beverley estates of his uncle, Sir Michael Warton, MP for Beverley.

Career
Pelham was returned as a Tory Member of Parliament for Great Grimsby at the 1722 general election. He inherited property from his uncle Sir Michael Warton  in 1725 and at the  1727 general election he was returned instead as MP for Beverley. In Parliament he voted against the Government. He was defeated significantly at the 1734 general election, but was elected for Beverley again at a by-election on 2 February 1738.  On the motion for Walpole’s dismissal in February 1741, he was one of the Tories who withdrew before the division.  He was returned top of the poll at the  1741 general election, and was returned unopposed in  1747. He retired at the 1754 general election.

Personal life
He married Anne Gore daughter of Sir William Gore, Lord Mayor of London, on 29 June 1714. His first wife died on 8 March 1739, and he married Mary Vyner, daughter of Robert Vyner of Gautby, Lincolnshire.

He died without issue on 6 February 1763, and his estates passed to his grand-nephew, Charles Anderson, who added the surname Pelham. He was created the 1st Baron Yarborough in 1794.

References

1670s births
1763 deaths
Members of the Parliament of Great Britain for Great Grimsby
British MPs 1722–1727
British MPs 1727–1734
British MPs 1734–1741
British MPs 1741–1747
British MPs 1747–1754